Raphaël Haroche (born 7 November 1975), professionally known under his mononym Raphael, is a French singer–songwriter and actor.

Personal and media life 
Raphael was born as Raphaël Haroche on 7 November 1975 in Paris, France, and was raised in Boulogne-Billancourt, Hauts-de-Seine. Through his father he is of Moroccan and Russian Jewish descent and his mother is Argentinian. One of his paternal uncles is physics Nobel prize laureate Serge Haroche.

During his childhood and his adolescence, Raphael played the piano and the guitar.

In June 2007, Raphael placed ninth on the French Elle magazine "15 Sexiest Man" list. He has been in a relationship with actress Mélanie Thierry, who appeared in the music video for his single "Caravan". On 24 May 2008, Thierry gave birth to the couple's first child, Roman. Their second son, Aliocha, was born in December 2013.

Musical career 
In 2000, Raphael released his first album Hôtel de l'univers (the title is a tribute to Arthur Rimbaud), but it was not until three years later that he enjoyed his first mainstream success with the song Sur la Route, a duo with famous French singer Jean-Louis Aubert, included in his second album La Réalité. With this album, he chose folk music.

In 2005, Raphael released his third album, Caravane, to huge critical acclaim and commercial success. He received three Music's Victories in 2006.

In September 2006, Raphael released the double live album Résistance à la nuit featuring songs from his first three albums as well as a nod to Íngrid Betancourt in the form of the songs La petite chanson and Ceci n'est pas un adieu.

At the beginning of 2007, Raphael became a member of the supergroup Les Aventuriers d'un autre Monde with Jean-Louis Aubert, Alain Bashung, Cali, Daniel Darc, and Richard Kolinka.

In February 2007, Raphael released his live acoustic album Une nuit au Châtelet which is partly a tribute to French singers such as Bernard Lavilliers, Gérard Manset, and Serge Gainsbourg. Amongst the many musicians working on this project was ex-David Bowie pianist Mike Garson.

Raphael's fourth studio album, Je sais que la terre est plate was released on 17 March 2008. This album featured the song Haïti, a collaboration with the Jamaican group Toots & the Maytals.

On 27 September 2010, Raphael released his fifth studio album, Pacific 231.

Other work 
In 1999, Raphael made a brief appearance in the comedy film Peut-être (French: Maybe), directed by Cédric Klapisch. He would subsequently had small roles in The Dancer (2000) and the television film Les grand gamins. In 2010, Raphael portrayed the character of Louis in Ces amours-là, directed by Claude Lelouch. The film was premiered in France on 15 September 2011.

Discography

Studio albums

Live albums

Singles

As a featured artist

Other charting songs

Filmography

Awards and nominations

Notes

References

Further reading 
 Bartillat, Cyril Anthony: Raphaël, une route dans l'univers (2007)
 Bataille, Sébastien: Raphaël de A à Z (2006)
 Joyaux, Véronique: Raphaël, charme et talent (2006)
 Terray, Marie; d'Oliv' par LuK; Piatek, Dorotée; Lhuissier, Basile; Blondelle, Gwendal; Tixier, Julien: Les Chansons de Raphaël en BD (2006)

External links 
 
 

1975 births
Male actors from Paris
French composers
French male composers
French male film actors
French people of Argentine descent
French people of Russian-Jewish descent
French people of Moroccan-Jewish descent
French pop singers
French rock singers
French songwriters
Male songwriters
French male television actors
Living people
Musicians from Paris
People from Boulogne-Billancourt
University of Paris alumni
World Music Awards winners
Paris 2 Panthéon-Assas University alumni
21st-century French singers
21st-century French male singers